The lesser hairy-footed dunnart (Sminthopsis youngsoni) is a small carnivorous Australian marsupial of the family Dasyuridae. It is a widespread and fairly common species, being found in many desert areas of Western Australia, Northern Territory and Queensland. Its foraging strategies have been studied by Haythornthwaite and Dickman.

The lesser hairy-footed dunnart is distinguished from the very similar hairy-footed dunnart by its smaller size and less hairy soles.

References

Dasyuromorphs
Mammals of Western Australia
Mammals of South Australia
Mammals of the Northern Territory
Marsupials of Australia
Mammals described in 1982